This is a list of African-American newspapers that have been published in the state of Delaware.  It includes both current and historical newspapers.   

The first known African-American newspaper published in Delaware was Our National Progress, which from 1869 to 1875 was published simultaneously in Wilmington and other cities in the Mid-Atlantic states, and was "viewed by some as the only national Black paper in the corridor between Washington and New York." Other notable Delaware papers include The Advance (1899–1901), and the Wilmington Advocate, which noted poet and journalist Alice Dunbar Nelson operated from 1920 to 1922.

The majority of such newspapers have been published in Wilmington, the state's capital.  However, for much of its history Wilmington's African American population was too small to support even one such newspaper at a time. Irvine Garland Penn, who tabulated the African-American newspapers in circulation in 1880 and 1890 in The Afro-American Press and Its Editors, did not list a single Delaware newspaper for either year. For much of the late 19th and early 20th centuries when no African-American paper operated, news of the community was shared in a column in one of Wilmington's white weeklies, the Sunday Morning Star.

Newspapers

See also 
List of African-American newspapers and media outlets
List of African-American newspapers in Maryland
List of African-American newspapers in New Jersey
List of African-American newspapers in Pennsylvania
List of newspapers in Delaware

Works cited

References 

Newspapers
Delaware
African-American
African-American newspapers